Van Waiters (born February 27, 1965) is a former professional American football linebacker who played five seasons in the National Football League (NFL) for the Cleveland Browns and Minnesota Vikings.  Waiters scored a receiving touchdown against the Vikings in 1989 on a pass from Mike Pagel on a fake field goal play.

References

1965 births
American football linebackers
Cleveland Browns players
Minnesota Vikings players
Indiana Hoosiers football players
Living people
Sportspeople from Coral Gables, Florida